Girraj Kishore Bhajanlal Mahaur is an Indian politician and former Member of legislative assembly for Hassanpur constituency (Now Hodal (Vidhan Sabha constituency) ) as Lokdal candidate in Haryana 1982. He belongs to the Mahaur Koli caste of Haryana.

References 

Living people
1950 births